Maximilian Karl Otto von Herff (17 April 1893 – 6 September 1945) was a German senior SS commander during the Nazi era. He served as head of the SS Personnel Main Office from 1942 to 1945.

Early life 
Maximilian von Herff was born in Hanover on 17 April 1893, the son of a general practitioner.  The Protestant von Herff family originated from Herve in Belgium and moved to the Palatinate in 1577 to escape religious persecution. His ancestor Christian Herff had been inducted into the noble class in 1814.

After school, Maximilian von Herff joined the army and became Leutnant (second lieutenant) in an infantry regiment of the Prussian Army); he served with the unit throughout World War I. He stayed in the Reichswehr after the war, and in 1926 served as Oberleutnant (lieutenant) in the 18. Reiter-Regiment in Stuttgart. In Wehrmacht on 3 January 1939, Herff reached the rank of Oberstleutnant (lieutenant-colonel).

World War II
During World War II, Herff served with the Deutsches Afrika Korps in North Africa. He was promoted to Oberst (colonel) and commanded "Kampfgruppe von Herff". For his service in North Africa he was awarded the Knight's Cross of the Iron Cross in June 1941.

At the suggestion of Heinrich Himmler, he transferred to the Waffen-SS. On 1 April 1942 Herff joined the Nazi Party (member no. 8 858 661) and the SS (member no. 405 894). From 1 October 1942 to 8 May 1945, he was chief of the SS Personnel Main Office. Herff dealt with internal and financial SS matters.

In his later diary entries, Herff claimed to have had knowledge of the Final Solution but not have played any role in administrative or actual involvement in exterminations or deportations. However, on 14–15 May 1943, Herff was in Warsaw during the Warsaw Ghetto Uprising and supervised its suppression under orders from Himmler. His adjutant,  wrote of the deportations carried out following the uprising to Auschwitz concentration camp and other camps where "special action" was required. Jürgen Stroop's report on the Warsaw Ghetto Uprising contains a photograph of Herff and Stroop taken during the May 1943 visit and confirms Herff's visit to the ghetto 14 May 1943.

On 20 April 1944, Herff was promoted to SS-Obergruppenführer (SS general).

Capture and death
Herff was taken prisoner by British forces in 1945, and held at Grizedale Hall POW camp. He suffered a stroke and died at nearby Conishead Priory Military Hospital. He was later reburied at Cannock Chase German Military Cemetery, Staffordshire.

His sister Carin von Herff moved to London during his imprisonment where she lived for four years before returning to Germany with her French Huguenot husband, a former SS-Oberführer of the 33rd Waffen Grenadier Division of the SS Charlemagne (1st French). Both were acquitted of any war crimes and, along with Maximilian von Herff, claimed they were only involved in the Nazi Party base and Waffen-SS not the extermination of the Jews. The couple later returned to live in England in the 1960s.

His cousin was Eberhard Herf, a senior SS police official. He commanded Police Regiment North and Order Police units in Minsk, Belarus; in the latter capacity, Eberhard Herf directed mass murder of the Jews in the Minsk Ghetto. Following the war, Eberhard Herf was convicted in the Minsk Trial and executed.

Awards
Knight's Cross of the Iron Cross on 13 June 1941 as Oberst and as commander of Kampfgruppe "von Herff" (Schützen-Regiment 115).

References

1893 births
1945 deaths
SS-Obergruppenführer
Holocaust perpetrators in Poland
Recipients of the Knight's Cross of the Iron Cross
Reich Security Main Office personnel
Waffen-SS personnel
Personal staff of Heinrich Himmler
20th-century Freikorps personnel
Burials at Cannock Chase German Military Cemetery
Prisoners who died in British military detention
Nazis who died in prison custody
Military personnel from Hanover
German prisoners of war in World War II held by the United Kingdom